Here and Now is the second EP from Australian musician Gretta Ray, released on 10 August 2018 through AWAL. 

Here and Now debuted and peaked at number 46 on the ARIA Albums Chart.

Reception
Hayden Davies from Pilerats said:

Track listing

Personnel
Adapted from the EP's liner notes.

Musicians
 Gretta Ray – writing, vocals  
Other musicians
 Jonathan Dreyfus – strings, arrangement, performance , additional musician 
 Josh Barber – additional musician 
 Adam Ollendorff – additional musician 
 Louis Gill – additional musician 
 Adam Keafer – additional musician 
 Shannon Busch – additional musician 
 Stephen Mowat – additional musician 
 Leigh Fisher – additional musician 
 Simon Rabl – additional musician 
 Conor Black-Harry – additional musician

Technical
 Josh Barber – production 
 Jonathan Dreyfus – production 
 Jono Steer – production 
 Leigh Fisher – production 
 John Castle – mixing 
 Ryan Hewitt – mixing 
 Will Duperier – mixing assistance 
 Fraser Montgomery – engineering 
 Nick Edin – engineering 
 Lachlan Carrick at Moose Mastering – mastering

Artwork and design
 Kareena Zerefros – cover portrait 
 Rory Dewar – packaging design

Charts

Release history

Notes

References

2018 debut EPs
Gretta Ray EPs
Self-released EPs